is a Japanese professional footballer who plays as a centre back for J1 League club Hokkaido Consadole Sapporo.

Playing career
Nakamura was born in Hokkaido and played youth football with Hokkaido Consadole Sapporo before starting his professional career with their senior team in 2018. Following a loan spell at Honda FC, Nakamura continued back with Consadole Sapporo from the 2021 season.

Career statistics

References

External links

Profile at Hokkaido Consadole Sapporo

2000 births
Living people
Association football people from Hokkaido
Japanese footballers
Japan Football League players
Hokkaido Consadole Sapporo players
Honda FC players
Association football central defenders